Acleris ganeshia is a species of moth of the family Tortricidae. It is found in Nepal.

The wingspan is about 32.5 mm for males and 24 mm for females. The ground colour of the male forewings is brownish grey with olive admixture and weak ferruginous suffusion in the median cell and the terminal area. The strigulae, dots and lines are black. The hindwings are transparent brownish with browner strigulae. The ground colour of the females is brownish with ferruginous or dark grey hues. The strigulation, lines and punctation are black.

Etymology
The species name refers to the type locality.

References

Moths described in 2012
ganeshia
Moths of Asia